King's College School Boat Club is the rowing club of King's College School, Wimbledon, London, England.

History
The club's boat house is based on the towpath in Putney, south-west London, on the River Thames. It was previously owned by Barclays. Previously, the club was based upriver, just above Hampton Court at Molesey Boat Club.

Other Uses
It is used by Cambridge University Boat Club when practising and competing in their annual Boat Race against Oxford University Boat Club on the Tideway. It is also used by other visiting clubs when they are competing on the Tideway.

The club room is available for hire through the school itself.

Honours

British champions

References

External links 
 The KCSBC Supporters' Association Website

Tideway Rowing clubs
Sport in the London Borough of Wandsworth
Buildings and structures in the London Borough of Wandsworth
Rowing clubs of the River Thames
Scholastic rowing in the United Kingdom